Leandro Daniel Paredes (born 29 June 1994) is an Argentine professional footballer who plays as a defensive midfielder for  club Juventus, on loan from Ligue 1 club Paris Saint-Germain, and the Argentina national team. He was part of the squad that won the 2022 FIFA World Cup.

Club career

Boca Juniors 
Paredes made his league debut for Boca Juniors in a 2–0 away defeat to Argentinos Juniors on 6 November 2010. On 29 January 2014, he joined Italian Serie A outfit Chievo Verona  for the rest of the 2013–14 season.

Roma 
It was revealed that Roma agreed to sign Paredes from Boca Juniors on loan with a reported €4.5 million pre-set price, however Roma ran out of non-EU registration quota for international transfer. He was signed by Chievo instead.

On 19 July 2014, Paredes joined Roma in a temporary deal, with an option to buy outright from Boca Juniors. On 27 September 2014, Paredes made his Roma debut, as a second-half substitute in the 2–0 win against Hellas Verona. On 8 February 2015, Paredes scored his first Roma goal in the club's 2–1 victory against Cagliari. In June 2015, Roma signed Paredes for €6.067 million.

Zenit Saint Petersburg 
On 1 July 2017, Zenit announced the signing of Paredes on a four-year contract. The fee was €23 million with a possible €4 million in add-ons.

Paris Saint-Germain 
On 29 January 2019, Paris Saint-Germain announced the signing of Paredes on a four and-a-half year contract, for an initial €40 million, potentially rising to €47 million. He scored his first goal for the club in a 2–0 victory against Pau in the Coupe de France on 29 January 2020, exactly a year after signing for PSG, while wearing the captain's armband.

On 10 April 2021, Paredes scored his first Ligue 1 goal, a free-kick in a 4–1 win over Strasbourg.

Loan to Juventus 

On 31 August 2022, Paredes joined Serie A club Juventus on a season-long loan with an option-to-buy.

International career
On 19 May 2017, Paredes received his first senior call-up by newly appointed coach Jorge Sampaoli for Argentina's friendlies against Brazil and Singapore in June. He made his senior international debut in the match against Singapore on 13 June, helping Argentina to a 6–0 away win, and also marked his debut by scoring his first international goal.

In May 2018, he was named in Argentina’s preliminary 35-man squad for the 2018 FIFA World Cup in Russia but did not make the final 23. On 21 May 2019, Paredes was included in Lionel Scaloni's final 23-man Argentina squad for the 2019 Copa América. Following Argentina's third-place achievement, Paredes was listed among the "Best XI" team of the tournament.

In June 2021, he was included in Lionel Scaloni's final Argentina 28-man squad for the 2021 Copa América. In the semi-finals of the competition, Argentina played against Colombia and the match eventually went into a penalty-shootout during which Paredes successfully converted his spot-kick to help Argentina progress to the final.

On 11 November 2022, Paredes was named to Argentina's final 26-man squad for the 2022 FIFA World Cup. During Argentina's quarterfinal match against the Netherlands, Paredes fouled Nathan Aké and deliberately smashed the ball into the Dutch bench, prompting a brawl. Paredes scored in the penalty-shootout against the Netherlands winning 4–3 for Argentina after the game was tied 2–2 (a.e.t). Paredes scored again in the penalty-shootout against France in the World Cup final. Winning the penalty-shootout 4–2, after the game was tied 3–3 (a.e.t).

Personal life 
Paredes is of Paraguayan descent through his mother and speaks fluent Guaraní. Paredes' cousin, Franco, is also a professional footballer.

Career statistics

Club

International

Scores and results list Argentina's goal tally first, score column indicates score after each Paredes goal.

Honours 
Boca Juniors
Argentine Primera División: Apertura 2011
Copa Argentina: 2011–12

Zenit Saint Petersburg
Russian Premier League: 2018–19

Paris Saint-Germain
Ligue 1: 2018–19, 2019–20, 2021–22
 Coupe de France: 2019–20, 2020–21
 Coupe de la Ligue: 2019–20
Trophée des Champions: 2019, 2020, 2022

Argentina
FIFA World Cup: 2022
Copa América: 2021 
CONMEBOL–UEFA Cup of Champions: 2022

Individual
 Copa América Team of the Tournament: 2019

References

External links 

 
 

Living people
1994 births
Argentine footballers
Association football midfielders
Argentina youth international footballers
Argentina international footballers
2019 Copa América players
2021 Copa América players
2022 FIFA World Cup players
FIFA World Cup-winning players
Boca Juniors footballers
A.C. ChievoVerona players
A.S. Roma players
Empoli F.C. players
FC Zenit Saint Petersburg players
Paris Saint-Germain F.C. players
Juventus F.C. players
Argentine Primera División players
Serie A players
Russian Premier League players
Ligue 1 players
Argentine expatriate footballers
Argentine expatriate sportspeople in Italy
Expatriate footballers in Italy
Argentine expatriate sportspeople in Russia
Expatriate footballers in Russia
Argentine expatriate sportspeople in France
Expatriate footballers in France
Copa América-winning players
Sportspeople from Buenos Aires Province
Argentine people of Guaraní descent
Argentine sportspeople of Paraguayan descent